Marie Thérèse Rollande Killens (born 29 June 1927) is a former Canadian politician who served as a Liberal member of the House of Commons of Canada. She is an administrator by career.

She represented the riding of Saint-Michel, which became known as Saint Michel—Ahuntsic in 1983. Her victories in the 1979, 1980 and 1984 federal elections, earned her terms in the 31st, 32nd and 33rd Canadian Parliaments.

She did not campaign in the 1988 federal election and left federal politics at the completion of her third term in office.

Electoral record

External links
 

1927 births
Living people
Members of the House of Commons of Canada from Quebec
Liberal Party of Canada MPs
Women members of the House of Commons of Canada
Women in Quebec politics
People from Trois-Rivières